Bissara, also known as bissouro which means cooked beans in ancient Egyptian language or Bessara, Besarah and Tamarakt (Arabic: "بصارة", Berber: "Tabissart" or "talkhcha") 

The dish contains simple ingredients: Split fava beans, onions, garlic, fresh aromatic herbs and spices. All ingredients are slowly cooked and then blended together to yield a creamy and fragrant dip or side dish.

Food historians believe that the name Bissara originates from the Hieroglyphic world “Bisourou” or cooked beans.  puréed broad beans as a primary ingredient. Additional ingredients include garlic, olive oil, lemon juice, hot red pepper, cumin, and salt. Bissara is sometimes prepared using split peas or chickpeas. In Egypt, bissara also includes herbs or leafy greens—particularly parsley, mint, dill, spinach, or molokhiya, though the latter is more commonly added by Egyptian expatriates in Palestine—and is eaten with bread as a dip. It is typically inexpensive, and has been described as a pauper's dish.

Bissara is a dish in Egyptian cuisine and Moroccan cuisine. In Egypt, bissara is eaten exclusively as a dip for bread, and is served for breakfast, as a meze, or more rarely, for lunch or dinner. Egyptian bissara includes herbs or leafy greens, hot peppers, lemon juice, and occasionally onion. It is traditionally a rural farmer's dish, though it has become more popular in urban Egypt since 2011 because it is healthier than its urban counterpart, ful medames. 

In Morocco, bissara is popular during the colder months of the year, and can be found in town squares and various alleyways. It is typically served in shallow bowls or soup plates, and topped with olive oil, paprika, and cumin. Bread is sometimes eaten dipped into the dish, and lemon juice is sometimes added as a topping.

See also

 List of bean soups
 List of soups

==

References

Arab cuisine
African soups
Bean soups
Egyptian cuisine
Moroccan cuisine
Palestinian cuisine
Moroccan soups